Space Between is the eighteenth studio album by American singer-songwriter Sammy Hagar, and the first studio album to credit Sammy Hagar and the Circle. This album was released on May 10, 2019, by BMG. The album was produced by Jaimeson Durr, vocalist Sammy Hagar, and guitarist Vic Johnson, and debuted at No. 4 on the US Billboard 200 chart, making it Hagar's second highest charting album to date.

Track listing

Personnel 
Sammy Hagar and the Circle

Michael Anthony – bass guitar, backing vocals
Jason Bonham – drums, percussion, backing vocals
 Sammy Hagar – lead vocals
 Vic Johnson – guitar, backing vocals

Additional musicians

 Audie DeLone – keyboards
 Ian Hatton – additional guitar
Brett Tuggle – keyboards

Production

 Steven Campodonico – engineer
 Jaimeson Durr – producer, recording, mixing
 Sammy Hagar – producer
 Ian Hatton – engineer
 Alan Howarth – engineer
Ted Jensen – mastering
 Vic Johnson – producer
 F. Reid Shippen – mixing

Charts

Weekly charts

Year-end charts

References

Sammy Hagar and the Circle albums
2019 debut albums
BMG Rights Management albums